Polystira artia is a species of sea snail, a marine gastropod mollusk in the family Turridae, the turrids.

The paratype is located at the USNM.

Distribution
This species occurs at Baja California, Mexico.

References

 Abbott, R. T. (1974). American seashells. The marine Mollusca of the Atlantic and Pacific coast of North America. ed. 2. Van Nostrand, New York. 663 pp., 24 pls.

External links
  Todd J.A. & Rawlings T.A. (2014). A review of the Polystira clade — the Neotropic's largest marine gastropod radiation (Neogastropoda: Conoidea: Turridae sensu stricto). Zootaxa. 3884(5): 445-491.

artia
Gastropods described in 1957